The Oakland Banshees are a women's semi-professional American football team based in Oakland, California.  A member of the Independent Women's Football League, the Banshees play their home games at Chabot College in nearby Hayward.

Season-By-Season

|-
| colspan="6" align="center" | Oakland Banshees (WAFL)
|-
|2001 || 2 || 6 || 0 || 2nd Pacific Central Division || --
|-
| colspan="6" align="center" | Oakland Banshees (WAFC)
|-
|2002 || 4 || 4 || 0 || 4th League || Lost WAFC Semifinal (Sacramento)
|-
| colspan="6" align="center" | Oakland Banshees (IWFL)
|-
|2003 || 4 || 4 || 0 || 2nd West Pacific SouthWest || --
|-
|2004 || 8 || 0 || 0 || 1st West Pacific SouthWest || Lost Western Conference Semifinal (Corvallis)
|-
|2005 || 5 || 4 || 1 || 4th West Pacific Southwest || --
|-
|2006 || 0 || 2 || 0 || X-Team || --
|-
|2007 || colspan="6" rowspan="1" align="center" | Did Not Play
|-
|2008 || 0 || 4 || 0 || X-Team || --
|-
|2009 || -- || -- || -- || -- || --
|-
!Totals || 23 || 25 || 0
|colspan="2"| (including playoffs)

2009 season schedule

External links
Oakland Banshees official website

Independent Women's Football League
Sports teams in Oakland, California
Women's sports in California